Fitzhugh is a town in Pontotoc County, Oklahoma, United States. The population was 204 at the 2000 census.

Geography
Fitzhugh is located at  (34.662346, -96.775853).

Demographics

As of the census of 2000, there were 204 people, 75 households, and 62 families residing in the town. There were 82 housing units at an average density of 11.3 per square mile (4.3/km2). The racial makeup of the town was 82.35% White, 10.78% Native American, 0.98% from other races, and 5.88% from two or more races. Hispanic or Latino of any race were 0.98% of the population.

There were 75 households, out of which 46.7% had children under the age of 18 living with them, 72.0% were married couples living together, 6.7% had a female householder with no husband present, and 17.3% were non-families. 16.0% of all households were made up of individuals, and 5.3% had someone living alone who was 65 years of age or older. The average household size was 2.72 and the average family size was 3.05.

In the town, the population was spread out, with 31.9% under the age of 18, 11.8% from 18 to 24, 24.0% from 25 to 44, 19.6% from 45 to 64, and 12.7% who were 65 years of age or older. The median age was 31 years. For every 100 females, there were 82.1 males. For every 100 females age 18 and over, there were 93.1 males.

The median income for a household in the town was $35,208, and the median income for a family was $35,625. Males had a median income of $31,875 versus $27,500 for females. The per capita income for the town was $12,395. About 10.4% of families and 18.1% of the population were below the poverty line, including 15.7% of those under the age of eighteen and 12.9% of those 65 or over.

See also

 List of towns in Oklahoma

References

External links

 Encyclopedia of Oklahoma History and Culture - Fitzhugh

Towns in Pontotoc County, Oklahoma
Towns in Oklahoma